Helena Ekholm (née Helena Jonsson) (born September 6, 1984 in Helgum) is a former Swedish biathlete. She was born in Helgum, Sollefteå Municipality. She is the 2009 world champion in pursuit and the 2011 world champion in individual. She also won the Women's Overall World Cup in the 2008–09 season.

Career
Jonsson debuted in 2005 in Östersund in the relay, coming in 15th. In the following World Cup in Hochfilzen she participated in her first individual, coming in 41st. In early 2006 she participated in the Biathlon World Championships Mixed Relay event in 2006 in Pokljuka, coming in sixth. The 2006-07 Biathlon World Cup began very successfully for her. In the World Cup 3 in Hochfilzen, she came in fourth in the Individual, eighth in the Sprint, and was on the relay team which came in fifth. In the Biathlon World Championships 2007 in Antholz she continued her upward trend and placed fourth in the Sprint. As a high point she led the Swedish team to a gold medal in the mixed-relay. She celebrated her first World Cup victory in the 2006-07 Biathlon World Cup, the mass start in the final round at Khanty-Mansiysk. In the 2008–2009 season she won four more races, including the opening in Östersund where she won the individual race. In the 2009 World Championships in Pyeongchang Jonsson came from 5th place after the opening sprint to win the Pursuit.

Due to her marriage to fellow former biathlete David Ekholm, she changed her surname to Ekholm in the summer of 2010.

Biathlon World Cup placings 

(Retired 19 March 2012)

References

External links

 Official site
 Statistics from the International Biathlon Union
 Portrait and information about Helena Jonsson

 
 

1984 births
Living people
People from Sollefteå Municipality
Swedish female biathletes
Olympic biathletes of Sweden
Biathletes at the 2010 Winter Olympics
Mid Sweden University alumni
Biathlon World Championships medalists